Armando Rossi (born 20 April 1915 in Ayacucho, Peru; died 6 November 1977 in Lima, Peru) was a Peruvian basketball player. He competed in the 1936 Summer Olympics.

References

1915 births
1977 deaths
Peruvian men's basketball players
Olympic basketball players of Peru
Basketball players at the 1936 Summer Olympics
People from Ayacucho
20th-century Peruvian people